The K League Championship was the final competition (playoffs) of the K League season. The K League originally had playoffs after regular seasons, but the name of playoffs was officially decided in 2009. This competition was abolished in 2011.

All K League Championship records from 1984 to 1996 are not included in the current K League official statistics.

Summary
 Champions   Runners-up

Final
The winners of two regular stages in four early editions qualified for the two-legged final.

Playoffs of the top four (1998–2000)

The top four clubs of the regular league qualified for the championship from 1998 to 2000. The first round was played as a single match, and the semi-final was a two-legged tie. The final also consisted of two matches in 1998, but it changed to best-of-three the next year.

Playoffs of the top four (2004–2006)

When the regular league was split into two stages again from 2004 to 2006, the top two clubs in the overall table qualified for the championship in addition to two winners. Each semi-final was a single match, and the final comprised two matches.

Playoffs of the top six

The K League Championship increased participating clubs to six since 2007. The winners of regular league directly qualified for the final, and the second-placed team qualified for the semi-final. The other four clubs entered the first round, and the winners of the second round advanced to the semi-final. Each match was played as a single match, excluding the two-legged final.

Finals

Appearances

By club
 K League's principle of official statistics is that final club succeeds to predecessor clubs.

By city/province
 K League introduced home and away system in 1987.

By region
 K League introduced home and away system in 1987.

See also
 K League
 K League 1
 Korean Super Cup

References

External links 
Official website 
ROKfootball.com 
Footcoreen.com 
Soccerphile.com